Calliotropis denticulus is a species of sea snail, a marine gastropod mollusc in the family Eucyclidae.

Description
The length of the shell reaches 8 mm.

Distribution
This marine species occurs off New Caledonia.

References

 Vilvens C. (2007) New records and new species of Calliotropis from Indo-Pacific. Novapex 8 (Hors Série 5): 1–72.

External links
 Calliotropis denticulus

denticulus
Gastropods described in 2007